Ninebanks is a small village in south west Northumberland, England in the North Pennines Area of Outstanding Natural Beauty  north-east of Alston by road. It is noted for the early sixteenth century Ninebanks Tower, sometimes described as a pele tower, but possibly built as a watchtower.  It is made of sandstone and has four floors, the lowest of which is now below the level of the road.
There is an independently run Ninebanks Youth Hostel, which is actually in nearby Mohope.

Religious sites  

The first St Mark's Church on the present site in Ninebanks was consecrated in 1764. The church was rebuilt in 1871. Windows were given by Mr R Lee in 1880.

Notable people 
Isaac Holden, was born at Redheugh, Mohope around 1804 and baptised nearby at St Mark's Church, Ninebanks in 1805. He was a local philanthropist and a Methodist. His working life began in the lead mines of Mohope and the West Allen, later on he became an itinerant tea seller around the North Pennines. It was a livelihood he combined with community fund raising by selling poems, tracts and even his own portrait. Evidence of his contribution to community life can be seen in the old hearse house at Ninebanks. This was built to keep the "Holden hearse", which he presented to the people of the West Allen valley in 1856. It was his final act of generosity, as he died the following year. The stone-built hearse house can still be seen past St Mark's Church and the old school at Ninebanks and on the same side of the road to Carrshield. There is also a commemorative memorial to Isaac Holden in St Cuthbert's churchyard in Allendale. The  Isaac's Tea Trail is a circular walk named after him  Isaac's Tea Trail. This passes near the hamlet of Ninebanks.

References

External links

GENUKI (accessed: 26 November 2008)

Villages in Northumberland